Beykoz, also known as Beicos and Beikos, is a district in Istanbul, Turkey at the northern end of the Bosphorus on the Anatolian side. The name is believed to be a combination of the words bey and kos, which means "village" in Farsi. Beykoz includes an area from the streams of Küçüksu and Göksu (just before Anadoluhisarı) to the opening of the Bosphorus into the Black Sea, and the villages in the hinterland as far as the Riva creek. The mayor is Murat Aydın (AKP).

History
The mouth of the Bosphorus in ancient times was used as a place of sacrifice, specifically to petition Zeus and Poseidon for a safe journey across the Black Sea, without which no one would venture into those stormy waters.

The first people to settle the upper-Bosphorus were Thracians and Greeks and the ancient name for the area was Amikos (Αμικός in Greek) or Amnicus (Αμνικός), named after a Thracian king. However, the area has changed hands many times since. As well as being a strategically important crossing point, the Bosphorus is rich in fish. Consequently, Beykoz has been invaded by groups from around and beyond the Black Sea: Thracians, Bithynians, Persians, Greeks, Romans, Byzantines, and finally Turks.

In the Ottoman period, the land behind Beykoz was open country and forest used for hunting and an escape from the city by the Sultans and their court. The hunting lodge at Küçüksu, as well as the fountains and mosques that decorate the villages along the coast, date from this era. The name Beykoz was established at this time and is thought to be derived from Bey (meaning prince, lord or gentleman) and Koz (the Persian word for village). Koz is also a word for a type of walnut, which is another possible etymology.

Under Turkish control the straits have retained their strategic value, and British troops assembled in Beykoz on their way to fight in the Crimea in 1854.

Later attempts were made to bring industry to the area, most importantly the glassworks at Paşabahçe, which began as small workshops in the 17th century and by the 18th and 19th centuries were a well-established factory making the ornate spiral-designed or semi-opaque white glassware known to collectors worldwide as 'Beykoz-ware'.

On the hillsides above the Bosphorus Beykoz has always suffered from uncontrolled development and large areas above the Bosphorus are covered in illegal housing, where migrants have come to live and work in the glass and other industries. Areas like Çubuklu and Paşabahçe are continually struggling to build infrastructure to keep up with the housing being built illegally or semi-legally. Due to this incoming industrial workforce Beykoz has a working-class character unseen behind the luxury of the Bosphorus waterfront. Schooling is somewhat of a problem, and it is common to see children from the Beykoz area going to school by boat to the European side.

Now the illegal building is happening in the forests further back from the sea, particularly in the areas of Çavuşbaşı and Elmalı. This countryside is scattered with little villages, all of which are expanding now more roads are being put through.

Not all the new housing is scrappy, and Beykoz holds some of the most luxurious new development in the Istanbul area, the villa estates of Acarkent and Beykoz Konaklar, home to filmstars, members of parliament and other Istanbul glitterati.

Beykoz has a small fishing community (although the main fishing fleet is based in Istanbul itself). The fish restaurants at Anadolu Kavağı in particular have sprung up to serve day trippers from the Bosphorus tours by ferryboat.

Places to see

The Bosphorus coastal road runs up to Beykoz from Beylerbeyi (just below the Bosphorus Bridge) and there are roads down to the coast from the Fatih Sultan Mehmet Bridge too. The district can also be reached by water of course; by ferry from Eminönü, Beşiktaş. There are also smaller boats from Yeniköy to Beykoz, and from Bebek or Emirgan to the neighborhoods of Kanlıca or Anadolu Hisarı.

Of the three most distinctive buildings on the way up the Bosphorus to Beykoz, one is a classic Ottoman imperial hunting lodge Küçüksu Palace; one is much older, the castle of Anadolu Hisarı was constructed by the Ottomans during the buildup to the conquest in order to secure the Bosphorus for the Turkish armies; and one is more recent, the prominent white tower on the hill above Kanlıca is Khedive Palace, built in 1907 as the holiday home of the Khedive of Egypt. Khedive Palace is now a restaurant set in a very attractive park. Kanlıca and Anadolu Hisarı are pleasant villages with cafes on the waterfront to sit and have tea.

Along the coast are some of the most expensive houses in the city and many politicians and famous people in Turkey have villas here. Some of the grandest of the huge wooden Ottoman seaside houses called yalı can be found from Anadolu Hisarı up to Beykoz itself. As well as the obvious attraction of living by the water the large areas of forest parkland on hillside along much of this coast make the Beykoz waterfront a peaceful retreat from the city. But the water is the clincher: the scent of the sea coming off the Bosphorus, people fishing, the huge ships sliding by, the sound of foghorns in the evening; no wonder the restaurants and nightclubs on the shore are the classiest in the city, and the coast before Beykoz has its share of these - clubs such as Hayal Kahvesi or Club 29 in Çubuklu, restaurants such as Körfez or Lacivert (both near Anadolu Hisarı). 

Much of the coast is built on unfortunately, and the buses that drive the coast road are a law unto themselves but there are still plenty of spots on the waterfront to eat, drink, fish, or just sit. In places such as Yalıköy, there are boats moored up selling grilled mackerel.

In Beykoz city center itself there is a large park on the hillside (Beykoz Korusu), and a number of attractive Ottoman fountains. The town centre also has a village feel to it, with smallish, aging buildings, many of them houses rather than blocks of flats, especially on the hills that climb up away from the coast. Being far from city infrastructure, public transit is taking time to arrive, but the general peacefulness of neighbourly relations and the possibility of a Bosphorus view more than compensate.

Beyond Beykoz, there are large areas of forested countryside, where the people of Istanbul come for picnics on weekends. This is when Beykoz suffers some of the traffic congestion that plagues the city as a whole.
 
Some popular picnic spots include:
The upper Bosphorus villages of Anadolu Kavağı, Anadolufeneri, and Poyrazköy. In Anadolufeneri, the historical lighttower Anadolu Feneri can be visited. Kavak being particularly popular as the last stop on the Bosphorus ferry cruises, where people stop to eat fish and walk up to the castle on the hill. Fener and Poyraz are smaller but very pleasant fishing villages;
The Black Sea village of Riva; where you can swim but you must be careful as this is near the mouth of the Bosphorus and sometimes there are dangerous currents which causes risk of drowning.

The inland around and between Cumhuriyet Köyü, Ali Bahadır, Değirmendere, Akbaba, Dereseki, and Polonezköy are all popular retreats, and new roads were paved to service the luxury housing that is going up in places. Construction of the third bridge on the Bosporus, Yavuz Sultan Selim Bridge, and the second one to run through Beykoz district, further caused prices of real estate to soar.

There are a number of tombs of Muslim saints and holy places that also attract visitors, particularly the tomb of Joshua on a hill just before Anadolu Kavağı. The grave is that of Prophet Yusha, the successor to Prophet Musa.

Climate 
Beykoz proper experiences a borderline humid subtropical climate (Cfa/Cf) and oceanic climate (Cfb/Do) according to both Köppen and Trewartha climate classifications, with cool winters and warm summers. It is in USDA hardiness zone 9a and AHS heat zone 3. It is frequently affected by Foehn winds, especially in winter, which can occasionally result in temperatures above .

Neighborhoods in Beykoz
The neighborhoods of the district of Beykoz are:
<div>
Acarlar,
Akbaba,
Alibahadır,
Anadolu Hisarı,
Anadolu Kavağı,
Anadolufeneri,
Baklacı,
Bozhane,
Cumhuriyet,
Çamlıbahçe,
Çengeldere,
Çiftlik,
Çiğdem,
Çubuklu,
Dereseki,
Elmalı,
Fatih,
Göksu,
Göllü,
Görele,
Göztepe,
Gümüşsuyu,
İncirköy,
,
Kanlıca,
Kavacık,
Kaynarca,
Kılıçlı,
Mahmutşevketpaşa,
Merkez,
Ortaçeşme,
Örnekköy,
Öyümce,
Paşabahçe,
Paşamandıra,
Polonezköy,
Poyraz,
Riva,
Rüzgarlıbahçe,
Soğuksu,
Tokatköy,
Yalıköy,
Yavuz Selim,
Yeni Mahalle
and Zerzavatçı.

Education
Beykoz district is home to three universities, Istanbul Medipol University, Turkish-German University and Beykoz University.

Notes

References

External links
 Beykoz 1908 Supporters' web site

 
Bosphorus
Populated places in Istanbul Province
Fishing communities in Turkey
Districts of Istanbul Province
Illegal housing